The Nicolet Bird sanctuary is a protected area in Quebec and one of the 28 migratory bird sanctuary of that province. This refuge protects a migratory halt for duck and Canada goose and also a nesting area for waterfowl. It is located a few kilometers west of Nicolet on the south shore of Lake Saint Pierre.

Geography 
The bird sanctuary is located west of Nicolet, Quebec on the south shore of Lake Saint Pierre to the village of Baie-du-Febvre. It also includes some islands of the Delta of the Nicolet River. The site is considered to be a central area of the Lac-Saint-Pierre Biosphere Reserve in Canada 2000, as Ramsar Site in 1998 and as the Important Birds Conservation Area (ZICO).

The site is located in the town of Nicolet and the municipality of Baie-du-Febvre, both located in Nicolet-Yamaska and the Centre-du-Québec region.

Relief 

The site is low-lying and is flooded every Spring. The vegetation passes from the aquatic environment, to a marsh of fluviatile bulb, to a swamp, a forest and finally abandoned fields.

History 
National Defense acquired the site in the 1950s. The site was recognized as a resting place in 1969 and as a refuge in 1982.

Natural Heritage

Fauna 
During the spring migration, there were nearly 500,000 snow goose ("Chen caerulescens"), or nearly all of the population of species atlantica. It is also an important site for the migration of Canada (Branta canadensis), where more than 100,000 individuals were observed in 1998. There are also a number (Black duck) (Anas rubripes) and of black scoter (Melanitta nigra). During the autumn, there are a significant number of pintail ("Anas acuta"), small scaup ("Aythya affinis"), Scaup and golden-eye withered (Bucephala clangula).

Ducks nesting on the site are the Aix sponsa, the nasal duck, Anas clypeata, the gill duck, Anas strepera), 'American Anas americana', 'Aythya collaris', teal (Anas crecca) and the Blue-winged teal (Anas discors). It also serves as a breeding ground for red-necked ducks (Aythya americana), Oxyura jamaicensis and Wilson's phalarope] (Steganopus tricolor).

References

External links 

 Article: "Migratory Bird Sanctuary of Nicolet", Environment Canada

Migratory Bird Sanctuaries of Canada
Protected areas of Centre-du-Québec
Ramsar sites in Canada
Important Bird Areas of Quebec
Protected areas established in 1982